Góry  (German Uri) is a settlement in the administrative district of Gmina Kętrzyn, within Kętrzyn County, Warmian-Masurian Voivodeship, in northern Poland.

The settlement has a population of 20.

References

Villages in Kętrzyn County